The Timor–Alor–Pantar (TAP) languages are a family of languages spoken in Timor, Kisar, and the Alor archipelago in Southern Indonesia. It is the westernmost Papuan language family. and one of two such outlier families in east Nusantara (the other being the North Halmahera family).

The first classification attempts linked Timor–Alor–Pantar to North Halmahera, as well as other members of the proposed West Papuan phylum. The two families are arguably the only linguistic groups that can be linked to the Papuan families of Melanesia, none of which have demonstrable relatives outside of Oceania. More recent proposals have considered Timor–Alor–Pantar to be part of the Trans–New Guinea phylum. However, Holton and Klamer (2018) classify Timor–Alor–Pantar as an independent language family, as they did not find convincing links with Trans–New Guinea.
Usher (2020) finds them to be one of three branches of the West Bomberai family within Trans–New Guinea, with regular sound correspondences.

Languages
The languages are demonstrably related, with the Alor–Pantar languages forming a distinct subgroup. The following conservative classification is from Ross (2005), Schapper et al. (2012), and Holton et al. (2012).

 Alor–Pantar family
 East Timor (Oirata–Makasai) family
Bunak

The list given above is conservative, without any undemonstrated groups.

Bunak and the Alor–Pantar languages are sometimes grouped together as "West Timor", while Bunak and East Timor have been grouped as "Timor–Kisar".  Although the Alor–Pantar languages are clearly related, as are the Timor–Kisar languages and the two groups to each other, until comparative work is done on all languages simultaneously it will not be clear whether Bunak is closer to East Timor or to Alor–Pantar, or whether Alor–Pantar is a valid node. Kaiping and Klamer (2019), though, found Bunak to be the most divergent Timor-Alor-Pantar language, splitting off before East Timor and Alor-Pantar did.

Languages in Central and East Alor are generally more agglutinative than languages in Pantar and Timor, which are more isolating.

Classification history
Despite their geographic proximity, the Papuan languages of Timor are not closely related, and demonstration of a relationship between any of them is difficult, apart from the clearly related Alor–Pantar languages on the islands neighboring Timor.

Arthur Capell first proposed that the Timor languages were a family in 1941, and Watuseke & Anceaux did the same for Timor–Alor–Pantar in 1973. Both units have been broken up in more recent classifications, though their ultimate relationship is generally accepted.

In 1957 HKL Cowan linked the Timor languages to the West Papuan family. However, when Stephen Wurm expanded Trans–New Guinea in 1975, he decided Timor–Alor–Pantar belonged there, and he linked it to the South Bird's Head languages in a South Bird's Head – Timor–Alor–Pantar branch of that phylum. Wurm noted similarities with West Papuan, a different family, but suggested this was due to substratum influence.

Ross (2005) classifies Timor–Alor–Pantar with the West Bomberai languages, the two groups forming a branch within West Trans–New Guinea. Based on a careful examination of new lexical data, Holton & Robinson (2014) find little evidence to support a connection between TAP and TNG. However, Holton & Robinson (2017) concedes that a relationship with Trans-New Guinea and West Bomberai in particular is the most likely hypothesis, though they prefer to leave it unclassified for now.

Usher (2020) finds that the Timor–Alor–Pantar fit within the West Bomberai languages, as a third branch of that family, and has begun to reconstruct the West Bomberai protolanguage as the ancestor of Timor–Alor–Pantar, as well as proto–Timor–Alor–Pantar itself.

According to Dryer (2022), based on a preliminary quantitative analysis of data from the ASJP database, Timor–Alor–Pantar is likely to be a subgroup of Trans–New Guinea.

Language contact
The Timor–Alor–Pantar languages have been in considerable contact with these Austronesian languages:
Kawaimina languages (Kairui, Waima’a, Midiki, Naueti)
Kisar–Luangic languages (Kisar / Meher, Leti, Luang, possibly also Makuva)

Proto-language

Phonology
Holton & Klamer (2018) reconstruct the Proto–Timor–Alor–Pantar consonant inventory as follows:

{| 
| p || t ||  || k || 
|-
| b || d ||  || g || 
|-
| m || n ||  ||  || 
|-
| f || s ||  ||  || h
|-
| w ||  || j ||  || 
|-
|  || l, r, ʀ ||  ||  || 
|}

Proto–Alor–Pantar developed a voiceless uvular stop *q but lost *f and some of the liquids.

Usher (2020) reconstructs a somewhat different inventory:

{| 
| p || t || ts || k || kʷ
|-
| b || d || dz || g || gʷ
|-
| m || n ||  ||  || 
|-
|  || s ||  ||  || 
|-
| w ||  || j ||  || 
|-
|  || l, r ||  ||  || 
|}

*l and *r do not occur initially in native words.

Usher reconstructs the vowels as *i *u [*e] [*o] *a *ɒ (where it's not clear that *e, *o were phonemically distinct) and the diphthong *ai.

Heston reconstructs the vowels *a, *e, *i, *o, *u, and *ə.

Heston also proposes that Proto–Timor–Alor–Pantar had penultimate stress when the penultimate and final syllables were both light, and final stress when the final syllable was heavy.

Pronouns
Proto-Timor–Alor–Pantar pronouns as reconstructed by Ross (2005) are:

{| 
! !!sg!!pl
|-
!1excl
|rowspan=2|*ani~na||*ini
|-
!1incl
|*api
|-
!2
|*ai||*i
|-
!3
|*ga
|(*gi)
|}

Usher (2020) reconstructs the free and bound forms of the pronouns as:

{| 
! !!sg!!pl
|-
!1excl
|rowspan=2|*an, *na-||*in, *ni-
|-
!1incl
|*ap, *?
|-
!2
|*a, *a-||*i, *i-
|-
!3
|*ga, *ga-
|*gi, *gi-
|}

These have regular paradigms, with suffixes *-i and *-u on the bound forms, so for example 1sg is free *an, direct object and inalienable possessor *na-, locative, ergative and alienable possessor *nai, and dative *nau.

Ross (2005) suggest these pronouns reflect proto-Trans–New Guinea 1st person *na, *ni and 2nd person *ga, *gi, and possibly the pTNG dual/inclusive *-pi-. The objection has been raised that this requires positing a "flip-flop" in which proto-TNG second-person pronouns correspond to proto-TAP third-person pronouns. Usher however establishes that proto–West Bomberai initial *k was lost from proto–Timor–Alor–Pantar (for example, proto-WB  *kina 'eye', *kira 'water' and *kena[t] 'see' correspond to proto-TAP *ina, *ira and *ena), and that the proto–West Bomberai pronouns 2sg *ka and 2pl *ki, inherited from proto–Trans–New Guinea, correspond regularly to proto–Timor–Alor–Pantar *a and *i, while the proto–Timor–Alor–Pantar third-person pronouns *ga and *gi do not correspond to the rest of West Bomberai (or Trans–New Guinea) and are only coincidentally similar to the reconstructed proto-TNG second-person pronouns.

Lexicon

Schapper, et al. (2017)
Schapper, et al. (2017: 141-143) reconstruct the following proto-Timor-Alor-Pantar, proto-Alor-Pantar, and proto-Timor forms, demonstrating the relatedness of the Timor and Alor-Pantar languages.

proto-Timor-Alor-Pantar reconstructions (Schapper, et al. 2017)

{| class="wikitable sortable"
! gloss !! proto-Timor-Alor-Pantar !! proto-Alor-Pantar !! proto-Timor
|-
| bamboo || *mari || *mari || *mari
|-
| banana || *mugul || *mogol || *mugu
|-
| bark, call ||  || *lVu || *le(k)u(l)
|-
| bat || *madel || *madel || *maTa
|-
| bathe || *weLi || *weli || *weru
|-
| bird || *(h)adul || *(a)dVl || *haDa
|-
| bite || *ki(l) || *(ta)ki || *(ga)gel
|-
| blood || *waj || *wai || *waj
|-
| bone || *se(r, R) || *ser || *(se)sa(r, R)
|-
| breast || *hami || *hami || *hami
|-
| child || *-uaQal || *-uaqal || *-al
|-
| clew || *ma(i)ta(r) || *maita || *matar
|-
| coconut || *wata || *wata || *wa(t, D)a
|-
| crawl || *er || *er || *er
|-
| crouch || *luk(V) || *luk(V) || *luk
|-
| die || *mV(n) || *min(a) || *-umV
|-
| dirty || *karV(k) || *karok || *gari
|-
| dream || *(h)ipar || *hipar || *ufar(ana)
|-
| ear || *-waRi || *-uari || *-wali
|-
| eat || *nVa || *nai || *nua
|-
| excrement || *(h)at(V) || *has || *a(t, D)u
|-
| face || *panu || *-pona || *-fanu
|-
| far || *le(t, d)e || *lete || *eTar
|-
| fire || *hada || *hada || *haTa
|-
| fish || *habi || *habi || *hapi
|-
| flat || *tatok || *tatok || *tetok
|-
| garden || *magad || *magad(a) || *(u, a)mar
|-
| girl || *pan(a) || *pon || *fana
|-
| give || *-(e, i)na || *-ena || *-inV
|-
| grandparent || *(t, d)ama || *tam(a, u) || *moTo
|-
| green || *lugar || *(wa)logar || *ugar
|-
| hand || *-tan(a) || *-tan || *-tana
|-
| hear || *mage(n) || *magi || *mage(n)
|-
| inside || *mi || *mi || *mi
|-
| itchy || *iRak || *(i)ruk || *ilag
|-
| laugh || *jagir || *jagir || *jiger
|-
| leg || *buta || *-bat || *buta
|-
| low || *po || *po || *ufe
|-
| mat || *bit || *bis || *biti
|-
| meat || *isor || *iser || *seor
|-
| moon || *hur(u) || *wur || *huru
|-
| mountain || *buku || *buku || *bugu
|-
| name ||  || *-en(i, u) || *-nej
|-
| new || *(t, s)iba(r) || *siba(r) || *(t, s)ipa(r)
|-
| new place || *lan || *lan || *lan
|-
| nose || *-mVN || *-mim || *-muni
|-
| one || *nukV || *nuk || *uneki
|-
| other || *abe(nVC) || *aben(VC) || *epi
|-
| Pterocarpus indicus || *matar || *matar || *ma(t, D)ar
|-
| path || *jega || *jega || *jiga
|-
| person || *anV(N) || *anin || *anu
|-
| pig || *baj || *baj || *baj
|-
| pound || *tapa(i) || *tapai || *tafa
|-
| price || *boL || *bol || *bura
|-
| rain || *anu(r, R) || *anur || *ine(r, R)
|-
| rat || *dur(a) || *dur || *Dura
|-
| ripe || *tena || *tena || *tena
|-
| run || *tipar || *tiara || *tifar
|-
| scorpion || *pV(r, R) || *pVr || *fe(r, R)e
|-
| scratch || *karab || *karab || *gabar
|-
| sea || *tam(a) || *tam || *mata
|-
| shark || *sibar || *sib(a, i)r || *supor
|-
| sit || *mit || *mis || *mit
|-
| six || *talam || *talam || *tamal
|-
| sleep || *tia(r) || *tia || *tia(r)
|-
| spit || *puRV(n) || *purVn || *fulu(k, n)
|-
| spoon || *suRa || *surV || *sula
|-
| stand || *nat(er) || *nate(r) || *nat
|-
| star || *jibV || *jibV || *ipi(-bere)
|-
| stone || *war || *war || *war
|-
| sugarcane || *ub(a) || *huːba || *upa
|-
| sun || *wad(i, u) || *wadi || *waTu
|-
| taboo || *palu(l, n) || *palol || *falu(n)
|-
| tail || *-oRa || *-ora || *-ula(ʔ)
|-
| tongue || *-lebuR || *-lebur || *-ipul
|-
| tooth || *-wasin || *-uasin || *-wasin
|-
| tree || *hate || *tei || *hate
|-
| vagina || *-ar(u) || *-ar || *-aru
|-
| wake || *tan(i) || *-ten || *Tani
|-
| walk (1) || *lak(Vr) || *laka || *lagar
|-
| walk (2) || *lamV || *lam(ar) || *male
|-
| water || *jira || *jira || *ira
|-
| weave || *sine(N) || *sine(N) || *sina
|-
| yellow || *bagur(V) || *bagori || *gabar
|-
| 1pi || *pi || *pi- || *fi
|-
| 1sg || *na- || *na- || *n-
|-
| 3 || *gie || *ge || *gie
|-
| 3poss || *ga- || *ga- || *g-
|}

Usher (2020)
Some lexical reconstructions by Usher (2020) are:

{| class="wikitable sortable"
! gloss !! Proto-Timor-Alor !! Bunaq !! Proto-East Timor !! Proto-Alor-Pantar !! Proto-Alor-Pantar (Schapper et al.)
|-
! head/hair
|  ||  || *dzage ||  || 
|-
! hair of head
|  ||  || *dagu ||  || 
|-
! ear
| *ˈwali[k] || hol || *wali[k] || *wari || *-waRi
|-
! eye
| *ina ||  || *ina || *ina || –
|-
! nose
| *muni[k] ||  || *muni[k] || *muni || –
|-
! tooth
| *ˈwasin || -we || *wasin || *wasin || *-wasin
|-
! tongue
|  || -up || *ibul || *lebur || *-lebuR
|-
! foot/leg
| *iˈdi || -iri || *idi ||  || –
|-
! blood
| *waⁱ[s] || ho || *waⁱ[s] || *waⁱ || *waj
|-
! bone
|  ||  || *s[a/o]p[a/o] ||  || 
|-
! peel/skin
| *pasu ||  || *pasu || *pasu || –
|-
! breast
| *ami || -omoʔ || *ami || *ami || *hami
|-
! louse
| *amin ||  || *amin || *amin || –
|-
! dog
| *ˈj[a]bar || zap || *[dz/j]ebar || *jabar || *dibar
|-
! bird
| *ˈadz[o]l || hos || *adza || *adol || *(h)adul
|-
! egg
| *ˈudu || -ut || *udu ||  || [*uTa]
|-
! tree
| *at[eⁱ] ||  || *ate || *at[eⁱ] || *hate
|-
! man/male
| *nami ||  || *nami ||  || –
|-
! woman
| *tubur ||  || *tubur ||  || –
|-
! sun
| *ˈwadu || hot || *wadu || *wadu || *wad(i,u)
|-
! water
| *ˈira || il || *ira || *ira || *jira
|-
! fire
| *aˈda || hoto || *ada || *ada || *ada
|-
! stone
| *war || hol || *war || *w[o]r || *war
|-
! path
| *ˈ[ja]gal || hik || *iga[r] || *jagal || *jega
|-
! name
| *naⁱ || -ni || *naⁱ || *naⁱ || [*nei]
|-
! eat/drink
| *nawa ||  || *nawa || *naː || *nVa
|-
! one
| *uˈkani || uen || *ukani ||  || –
|-
! two
|  ||  || *age ||  || 
|}

Evolution
Pawley and Hammarström (2018) list the following probable reflexes of Proto-Timor-Alor-Pantar (pTAP) and proto-Alor-Pantar (pAP; reconstructions drawn from Holton and Klamer 2018) from proto-Trans-New Guinea (pTNG; reconstructions from Pawley and Hammarström 2018).

Key pTNG = proto-Trans New Guinea, pTAP = proto-Timor-Alor-Pantar, pAP = proto-Alor-Pantar

pTNG *am(i,u) ‘breast’ > pTAP *hami ‘breast’
pTNG *na ‘eat’ > pTAP *nVa ‘eat, drink’
pTNG *ata ‘excrement’ > pTAP *(h)at(V) ‘excrement’
pTNG *kumV- ‘die’ > pTAP *mV(n), pAP *min(a) ‘die’, pTimor *-mV ‘die’
pTNG *inda ‘tree, wood’ > pTAP *hate ‘fire, wood’
pTNG *panV > pTAP *pan(a) ‘girl’
pTNG *nan(a,i) ‘older sibling’ > pAP *nan(a) ‘older sibling’
pTNG *me ‘come’ > pAP *mai ‘come’
pTNG *mundu ‘nose’ > pTAP *mVN ‘nose’
pTNG *tukumba[C] ‘short’ > pAP *tukV ‘short’
pTNG *ŋgatata ‘dry’ > pAP *takata
pTNG *(m,mb)elak ‘lightning’ > Blagar merax, Retta melak ‘lightning’

However, Holton and Robinson (2014) classify Timor-Alor-Pantar as an independent language family, rather than as part of Trans-New Guinea.

References

Further reading
Klamer, Marian, Paul Trilsbeek, Tom Hoogervorst and Chris Haskett. 2015. Language Archive of Insular Southeast Asia and West New Guinea (LAISEANG). http://hdl.handle.net/1839/00-0000-0000-0018-CB72-4@view
Kaiping, Gereon A. & Edwards, Owen & Klamer, Marian (eds.). 2019. LexiRumah 2.2.3. Leiden: Leiden University Centre for Linguistics. Available online at https://lexirumah.model-ling.eu/lexirumah/. Accessed on 2019-09-14.
Greenhill et al., 2008. In: Kaiping, Gereon A. & Edwards, Owen & Klamer, Marian (eds.). 2019. LexiRumah 2.2.3. Leiden: Leiden University Centre for Linguistics. Available online at https://lexirumah.model-ling.eu/lexirumah/. Accessed on 2019-09-14.

External links 

 Timothy Usher, New Guinea World, Proto–Timor–Alor–Pantar
LexiRumah (part of the Lesser Sunda linguistic databases)
Reconstructing the past through languages of the present: the Lesser Sunda Islands
The Languages of East Timor: Some Basic Facts (Revised 24.8.2004) Geoffrey Hull

 
Languages of western New Guinea
West Bomberai languages